Strikeforce: Young Guns was a series of mixed martial arts events held by Strikeforce.

Strikeforce: Young Guns I
The inaugural event was held on February 10, 2007. The event took place at the San Jose Civic Auditorium in San Jose, California.

Results

Strikeforce: Young Guns II
Strikeforce: Young Guns II was an event held on February 1, 2008 at the San Jose Civic Auditorium in San Jose, California.

Results

Strikeforce: Young Guns III
Strikeforce: Young Guns III was an event held on September 13, 2008 at the San Jose Civic Auditorium in San Jose, California.

Results

See also
 Strikeforce
 List of Strikeforce champions
 List of Strikeforce events
 2007 in Strikeforce
 2008 in Strikeforce
 SSW Young Guns Championship

References

Young Guns
2007 in mixed martial arts
Mixed martial arts in San Jose, California
2007 in sports in California